Erwin Hochsträsser (date of birth and death unknowns) was a Swiss footballer who was a squad member for Switzerland in the 1934 FIFA World Cup. He also played for FC Lausanne-Sport and BSC Young Boys.

References

Swiss men's footballers
Switzerland international footballers
1934 FIFA World Cup players
Association football forwards
FC Lausanne-Sport players
BSC Young Boys players
Year of birth missing